Abyssocottus elochini is a species of ray-finned fish belonging to the family Cottidae, the typical sculpins. These sculpins are endemic to Lake Baikal in Russia. It is known to dwell at a depth range of 250–300 metres.

References

elochini
Fish described in 1955
Taxa named by Dmitrii Nikolaevich Taliev
Fish of Lake Baikal